Run and Skip was a National Hunt chaser who won the Welsh National in 1985 and was often ridden by Peter Scudamore. He was a regular in the Gold Cup and rated as high as 170 in the mid 1980s. He placed in many top chases including Whitbread, Cheltenham Gold Cup and Welsh Grand National. Fathered by Deep Run out of Skipperetta, he was one of the top chasers of the golden era.

National Hunt racehorses
Welsh Grand National winners